
Year 309 (CCCIX) was a common year starting on Saturday (link will display the full calendar) of the Julian calendar. In the Roman Empire, it was known as the Year of the Consulship of Licinianus and Constantius (or, less frequently, year 1062 Ab urbe condita). The denomination 309 for this year has been used since the early medieval period, when the Anno Domini calendar era became the prevalent method in Europe for naming years.

Events 
 By place 

 Roman Empire 
 Gaius Ceionius Rufius Volusianus, the Praetorian Prefect of Emperor Maxentius, defeats the usurper Domitius Alexander and purges Africa of his supporters.

 Persia 
 King Hormizd II, ruler of the Sassanid Empire, demands that the king of the Ghassanids pays tribute. After the king refuses, Hormizd invades Ghassanid territory. The Ghassanids seek aid from Maximinus Daza, but before a Roman army can arrive, Hormizd defeats the Ghassanid army and kills their king. A Ghassanid force then ambushes Hormizd's small retinue while the latter is on a hunting trip, and the Sasanian king is mortally wounded. He dies after a 7-year reign. 
 Hormizd is succeeded by his infant son Shapur II following the brief reign and murder of Adur Narseh.

 By topic 

 Religion 
 Pope Marcellus I is banished from Rome by  Emperor Maxentius.
 April 18 – Eusebius succeeds Marcellus I as the 31st pope, but is himself banished on August 17 to Sicily (these events may have also taken place in 310).

Births 
 Shapur II (the Great), king of the Sassanid Empire (d. 379)

Deaths 
 January 16 – Marcellus I, bishop of Rome (b. 255)
 Adur Narseh, king of the Sassanid Empire
 Elias and companions, Christian martyrs
 Hormizd II, king of the Sassanid Empire

References